AM-919 (part of the AM cannabinoid series) is an analgesic drug which is a cannabinoid receptor agonist. It is a derivative of HU-210 which has been substituted with a 6β-(3-hydroxypropyl) group. This adds a "southern" aliphatic hydroxyl group to the molecule as seen in the CP-series of nonclassical cannabinoid drugs, and so AM-919 represents a hybrid structure between the classical dibenzopyran and nonclassical cannabinoid families.

AM-919 is somewhat less potent than HU-210 itself, but is still a potent agonist at both CB1 and CB2 with moderate selectivity for CB1, with a Ki of 2.2 nM at CB1 and 3.4 nM at CB2.

See also 
 AM-4030

References 

Benzochromenes
Primary alcohols
Phenols
AM cannabinoids